Oberlander or Oberländer is a German surname, and may refer to:

People
Adolf Oberländer (1845-1923), German caricaturist 
Andy Oberlander (1905-1968), American football player
Cornelia Oberlander (1921–2021), Canadian landscape architect
Donna Oberlander (born 1970), American politician
Fred Oberlander (1911-1966), Austrian/British/Canadian wrestler 
Helmut Oberlander (born 1924), Ukrainian Canadian who served as an interpreter in the Einsatzgruppen
Jonathan Oberlander, professor at the University of North Carolina at Chapel Hill
Jon Oberlander, Professor of Epistemics, University of Edinburgh
Peter Oberlander (born 1922), Canadian architect 
Theodor Oberländer (1905-1998), Nazi activist, German politician, military leader, and agricultural scientist

Other
The South German Coldblood breed of horse (also known as the Oberland breed)
Oberlander Jews, a group of Jews originating from the Oberland region of Hungary

See also 
 Oberland (disambiguation)

Surnames
German-language surnames
Surnames of German origin